Turkish War Academies was an educational branch of the Turkish Armed Forces. It trained staff officers for Turkish Armed Forces.

History

The Turkish War College, which is the highest center for the Turkish art of war and military sciences, was founded in 1848. In line with the global developments in the first half of the 18th century, the Ottoman State had carried out a wide range of reforms including the Army as well. In 1845, upon a decree, an administrative order of Sultan Abdülmecid, the Military Board of Education, composed of the Army War Academy Commander Emin Pasha, Fuat Pasha and Sheik ul Islam Arif Hikmet, decided that “The Military High Schools shall be established; the Army War Academy shall consist of four years, and like the European Armies, new courses shall be created to produce general staff officers.” Acquiring an institutional identity after this process, the War College went through two significant phases before evolving into its present state.

Ottoman State Period
In order to train Staff Officers in the same system as European armies, the  3rd and 4th years were created in the Army War Academy under the name of “Imperial War School of Military  Sciences, General Staff Courses” in  1848. Abdülkerim Pasha was appointed  as the first director of these courses for the junior officers of the Imperial Ottoman Army. When the building in Harbiye was allocated as the guesthouse and  hospital for French Troops, the Ottomans’ ally in the Crimean War, in  the beginning of 1854, the College  moved to the"Istanbul Technical University"  building, today known as “Taşkışla”. By the end of 1858, the Army War Academy and General Staff Courses moved to the Military Hospital in Gülhane. Four years later, in 1862, they moved back into their former location in Harbiye, which had burned down and promptly restored during the Crimean War. 2 years later, what is now today the Naval War College was established as the staff school for the Imperial Ottoman Navy. As part of the reorganization efforts of the Ottoman Army, new arrangements were implemented in 1866 for the Staff Colleges and other Military Schools.

Through these arrangements, the General Staff training was extended to three years, and with additional military courses a special emphasis was placed on exercises and hands-on training. Although being a staff officer was initially considered as a different military branch in itself, effective from 1867 new programs were implemented to train staff officers for branches like infantry, cavalry and artillery. In 1899, a new system was developed on the basis of the view that the General Staff Courses should train more officers with higher military education in addition to Staff Officers’ training. Following this principle, a greater number of officers from the Army War Academy began to be admitted to the Staff College. This process continued until 1908. Mustafa Kemal Atatürk, the remarkable leader recognized by the entire world as well as by all Turks, and the founder of today's modern Republic of Turkey, was the source of pride for the 57th Term Staff Officers Course. In 1905, Atatürk graduated from the Staff College in Harbiye, to which he was admitted in 1902. This building is used as the Military Museum today.

Following the declaration of the Second Constitutional Period, the structure of the Army Staff College was rearranged with a new Staff College Regulation dated 4 August 1909. A couple of months later in October, the College was moved from Harbiye to the Yıldız Palace, Crown Prices’ Quarter with the new designation “General Staff School”. With this fundamental change, the practice of direct transition from Army War Academy to Staff College was abolished, and admission into the Staff College now required two years of field service following the Army War Academy. Afterwards, the officers were subjected to examinations, and those who passed the exam were admitted into the College as Staff Officer candidates.

During the War of Tripoli in 1911, the Balkan War of 1912–1913 and the Great War from 1914 to 1918, Staff Officers acquired much experience, and demonstrated an outstanding success during the Turkish War of Independence between the years 1919–1922. Following the occupation of Istanbul on 16 March 1920, military schools were dissolved by the victors of the First World War; nevertheless, the Staff College was managed to continue its activities until April 1921 at the Şerif Pasha Mansion in Teşvikiye, Istanbul where it had been moved on 28 January 1919. In view of the experiences gained during the First World War, substantial changes were made on the College curriculum in 1919, and a greater emphasis was placed on combat tactics and language courses. In early 1921, it was decided that the Staff College should be moved to Beylerbeyi. However, since all instructors and students went to Anatolia to join the Turkish War of Independence, the Staff College was closed down temporarily. Aside from  Atatürk himself, graduates of the Staff College during the early years of the 20th century fought in both conflicts.

Turkish Republic Period

On 13 October 1923, the Staff  College restarted its education and  training activities under the name of “Higher Military College” in Beyazıt, İstanbul in the building of Ministry of War, today known as the administration building of Istanbul University. About six months thereafter, on 24 March 1924, the College was renamed the “Directorate of the General Staff  College” and moved to the Yıldız Palace. In 1927, it was once more renamed as the “Staff College  Directorate”. The College continued its education and training activities in this location until 1975. The Higher Quartermaster School, which was established on 15 January 1927, the Quartermaster Senior Officers Course and the Quartermaster School, together with the “Higher Command Course” for senior officers were attached to the Staff College which was renamed as the “Military Colleges Command”, and from being only one staff college, began to grow with the 1930 reopening of the Naval War College. 7 years later came the establishment of the Air War College to train future staff officers of Turkish military aviation.

Due to the Second World War, for five years starting from 1941, the Army War College moved facilities to the Land Forces Command building in Ankara, and at the end of the war, moved back to its previous campus at the Yıldız Palace in 1946. The name of the colleges was changed to “The War Colleges Command” in March 1949. The National Security College was founded in 1952 and the Armed Forces Command College was established in 1954.

The National Security College moved to Ankara in 1995, and by moving back to İstanbul in 2012, it was merged with the Armed Forces College, and since then has been continuing its education and training activities as the Armed Forces Higher Command and Staff College. The “Land-Naval-Air Forces Cooperation Courses Command” located in Etimesgut, Ankara, under the Air Force Command, was transferred to Istanbul in 1960 and integrated into the Air War College.

Then in 1961, the “Courses Command” was established under the War Colleges Command and as of 15 February 1962, the “Land-Naval-Air Forces Cooperation Course”, “Special Command Course”, “Staff Officer Course” and “Nuclear Arms Course” were conducted. In order to unite the Higher Command Courses, and accordingly to co-locate all the colleges on the same campus, construction work for a new academic site was started on 12 March 1969 in Yenilevent, Istanbul. With the exception of a few departments, the War Colleges commenced the academic year 1975–1976 at their new facilities in Yenilevent, Istanbul on October 1 the same year. The new War Colleges Act came into force on 24 May 1989 by an act of the National Assembly, amending the charters of the War Colleges in the process. In the academic year 1990–1991, the “Seminar System” was adopted. Under this new system, the joint sessions of the Service War Colleges were increased and classes were reorganized into groups of 16 to 20 students.

In line with the amendments inserted into the War Colleges Act in 2003, graduate courses were initiated at the Service War Colleges, and for the first time in 2007, graduates were awarded with the “Master’s Degree”, in addition to “Staff Officer Diploma”. In order to meet the requirements of technological world of today, the War Colleges Command inaugurated the deeply needed Atatürk Wargaming and Convention Center on 25 July 2003 to support academic education and training activities, to experiment the joint concepts in simulated environment as well as exercise and seminar environments, to create the joint doctrines of the Turkish Armed Forces. The Centre had been operated under the name of the Atatürk Wargaming and Convention Centre until 1 August 2008, and then renamed the Joint Doctrine Development, Experimentation and Training Centre which is subordinate to the War Colleges Command.

The Strategic Research Institute is continuing its education and training activities since the 2003–2004 academic year to provide a postgraduate (master's and Ph.D.) level training, certificate programs, do scientific studies on the subjects requested by the Turkish Armed Forces but not effectively fulfilled by the institutes of the Military Academies and civilian universities. Academic requests from the Friendly and Allied Countries towards the War Colleges, which has a special place among its counterparts, are constantly increasing every year. More than 1,000 International Officers from 41 countries have graduated from the War Colleges since 1935. Today, at the end of a process, which has been shaped by the historical developments and experiences, there are five educational institutions within the organization of the War Colleges Command, which is a direct subordinate unit to the Turkish General Staff:
the Armed Forces Higher Command and Staff College, 
Army War College, 
Naval War College, 
Air War College,
and the Strategic Research Institute of the Turkish Armed Forces.

As such the War Colleges as a whole constitute a separate service arm of the Turkish Armed Forces.

After 2016 Turkish coup d'état attempt Turkish War Academies closed. The Joint War Institute, which is part of the new National Defence University, is now training staff officers for Turkish Armed Forces.

References
Milli Savunma Üniversitesi (msu.edu.tr)

Military academies of Turkey
Military units and formations established in 1923